Vinicius Bittencourt Almeida Magalhães (born July 30, 1971) is a Brazilian Jiu-Jitsu sixth degree black belt  under Carlos Gracie, Jr. and also at the same time a brown belt in Judo, and a Muay Thai expert. He has been teaching Brazilian Jiu-Jitsu for over 18 years. He has instructed mixed martial arts and grappling champions. Draculino has produced such talent as  Joaquim Ferreira, Romulo Barral, Alberto Crane, Marcelo Azevedo, Cristiano Titi, and Samuel Braga.

Draculino grew up with Ryan Gracie, Ralph Gracie, and Renzo Gracie, taking classes under both Jean Jacques Machado and Carlos Gracie, Jr. at the original Gracie Barra Academy. He began competition early, earning championships from the blue belt upwards. In 2007, Draculino, Ryan Gracie, and Roberto Gordo founded Gracie Fusion MMA team.  The unexpected death of Ryan put the fledgling team in question, but Draculino and Gordo kept the team active in tribute to Ryan's memory.

Vinicius previously signed a 2-fight contract with Strikeforce, and won his debut fight via decision against Rocky Long. He never completed his contract, as Strikeforce ceased operations in 2013. 

He is currently the Regional Director for Gracie Barra Texas.

Competitive accomplishments
 4x Pan American Champion (once in the master division)
 Pan American No-Gi Champion in master division
 2x Brazilian National Champion
 2x Silver Medalist of World BJJ Championships
 No-Gi International Master and Senior Champion
 Abu-Dhabi Contender

He (along with Renzo Gracie) is also one of the innovators of the Spider guard and one of the first to use it successfully in competition. The spider guard is now a mainstay guard in BJJ with hundreds of sweeps, submissions and variation that come from it.

Mixed martial arts record

|-
|Win
|align=center|2–1
| Rocky Long
|Decision (unanimous)
|Strikeforce: Houston
|
|align=center|3
|align=center|3:00
|Houston, Texas, United States
|
|-
|Loss
|align=center|1–1
| Fábio Mello
|TKO (cut)
|Storm Samurai 8
|
|align=center|1
|align=center|N/A
|Brasília, Brazil
|
|-
|Win
|align=center|1–0
| Kleber Gaudino
|Submission (arm-triangle choke)
|Heat FC 2: Evolution
|
|align=center|1
|align=center|4:55
|Natal, Rio Grande do Norte, Brazil
|
|-

Notes

External links

 http://www.DraculinoBJJTraining.com
 http://www.GracieBarraTx.com
 https://www.youtube.com/DraculinoTeamTx
http://www.Bjj.org
 http://www.draculino.com

Living people
Brazilian practitioners of Brazilian jiu-jitsu
1971 births
Brazilian male mixed martial artists
Featherweight mixed martial artists
Mixed martial artists utilizing Brazilian jiu-jitsu
Sportspeople from Rio de Janeiro (city)
People awarded a black belt in Brazilian jiu-jitsu